Ali Baba and the Forty Thieves is a 1918 American silent adventure film directed by Chester M. Franklin and Sidney Franklin and starring Georgie Stone, Gertrude Messinger and Lewis Sargent.

Cast
 Georgie Stone as Ali Baba 
 Gertrude Messinger as Morgiianna 
 Lewis Sargent as Khaujeh Houssain 
 Buddy Messinger as Kasim Bara 
 G. Raymond Nye as Abdullah 
 Raymond Lee as Also Talib 
 Charles Hincus as Aasif Azaar 
 Marie Messinger as Kasim's Servant 
 Jack Hull as Jameel

References

Bibliography
 Solomon, Aubrey. The Fox Film Corporation, 1915-1935: A History and Filmography. McFarland, 2011.

External links
 

1918 films
1918 adventure films
1910s English-language films
American silent feature films
American adventure films
American black-and-white films
Films directed by Chester Franklin
Films directed by Sidney Franklin
Fox Film films
1910s American films
Silent adventure films